Pomaderris parrisiae is a species of flowering plant in the family Rhamnaceae and is endemic to southern New South Wales. It is a shrub to small, slender tree with silvery-hairy branchlets, elliptic to lance-shaped leaves and panicles of hairy, creamy-yellow flowers.

Description
The upper surface of the leaves is glabrous and the lower surface is covered with silvery star-shaped hairs. The petals are egg-shaped with wavy edges, pale yellow and slightly shorter than the sepals. Flowering occurs in October and November and the fruit is a hairy capsule.

Taxonomy
Pomaderris parrisiae was first formally described in 1990 by Neville Grant Walsh in the journal Muelleria from specimens collected in 1987. The specific epithet (parrisiae) honours Margaret Parris of Merimbula, who collected the type specimens.

Distribution and habitat
This pomaderris grows in open forest or rainforest, mainly on the ranges between Kybean and Bemboka including in the Wadbilliga National Park and Egan Peaks Nature Reserve in southern New South Wales.

Conservation status
Pomaderris parrisiae is listed as "vulnerable" under the Australian Government Environment Protection and Biodiversity Conservation Act 1999 and the New South Wales Government Biodiversity Conservation Act 2016. The main threats to the species include illegal use of recreational vehicles, inappropriate fire regimes and disturbance from powerline management and road maintenance activities.

References

Flora of New South Wales
parrisiae
Plants described in 1990
Taxa named by Neville Grant Walsh